The LCDR L class or Enigma Class was a class of  steam locomotives of the London, Chatham and Dover Railway (LCDR). The class was designed by William Martley and introduced in 1869, intended for services between London and Dover.

History
Martley received authority to build three  shunting locomotives in November 1865, but the company's Longhedge workshops were unable to undertake the order due to other commitments. By the time they were able to do so, in October 1867, there was a more pressing need for  passenger engines and so the order was changed. Further delays meant that the first locomotive was not completed until March 1869, and had a second-hand  tender. It was intended to call the locomotive Premier but following a remark from Martley that "it was a complete enigma to him how completion was ever achieved," the chairman proposed the name Enigma which was used for the whole class.

The original locomotive was used on express goods trains. Two further very similar locomotives with larger  driving wheels, making them more suited to passenger duties were constructed between May 1869 and June/September 1870, which were regarded as being of the same class. These were named Mermaid and Lothair.

The three locomotives performed well and during 1882 Martley's successor William Kirtley, fitted new boilers and larger  cylinders. He also provided larger  tenders. At this time the class became LCDR L class, the names were removed and the locomotives numbered 50–52. These numbers were increased by 459 to become 509–511 following the amalgamation of the LCDR and SER to become the South Eastern and Chatham Railway in 1899.

Withdrawal
The class began to be withdrawn and scrapped from 1905 and all were gone by August 1906. The first two examples had accumulated one million miles at the time of withdrawal.

References

 

Enigma
2-4-0 locomotives
Railway locomotives introduced in 1869
Scrapped locomotives
Standard gauge steam locomotives of Great Britain